Dwight Allen may refer to:

 Dwight Sidney Allen (1843–1908), member of the Wisconsin State Assembly
 Dwight W. Allen (born 1931), professor of education